Arthur Lambourn (11 January 1910 – 24 September 1999) was a New Zealand rugby union player. A front rower, Lambourn represented Wellington at a provincial level, and was a member of the New Zealand national side, the All Blacks, from 1932 to 1938. He played 40 matches for the All Blacks including 10 internationals.

At the time of his death in 1999, Lambourn was the third oldest living All Black. Brother of Lt-Col Albert Lambourn who was awarded the DSO for his field artillery batteries engagement in the New Zealand break-out of Minqar Qaim.

References

1910 births
1999 deaths
People from Maryborough, Queensland
Australian emigrants to New Zealand
Wellington rugby union players
Rugby union hookers
Rugby union props
New Zealand rugby union players
New Zealand international rugby union players
Rugby union players from Queensland